Circulifer is a genus of leafhoppers in the tribe Opsiini and the subfamily Deltocephalinae. Some authors have treated it as a subgenus of Neoaliturus.

Species
 Circulifer alboflavovittatus Lindberg, 1954
 Circulifer dubiosus (Matsumura, 1908)
 Circulifer haematoceps (Mulsant & Rey, 1855)
 Circulifer hispaniae Young & Frazier, 1954
 Circulifer nitidus Young & Frazier, 1954
 Circulifer opacipennis (Lethierry, 1876)
 Circulifer rubrivenosus (Scott, 1876)
 Circulifer tenellus (Baker, 1896) – beet leafhopper

References 

 Circulifer on www.biolib.cz

External links

Cicadellidae genera
Opsiini